The International Gay Bowling Organization (IGBO) represents over 5000 lesbian, gay, bisexual, and transgender (LGBT) members from Australia, Canada, Germany, New Zealand, United Kingdom and United States. The organization was established in 1980 to provide a collaborative sporting group within the LGBT community.  The organization embraces the "ideals of Unity, Fellowship and Communication". By 2019, the group had more than 8,000 members.

History 
LGBT sports leagues began emerging in the United States in the 1970s, primarily as a social outlet for men and women who wished to fraternize with other homosexual amateur athletes in a non-bar atmosphere.

In 1989, the national tournament was held in Cincinnati, Ohio and featured 770 competitors. Stand-up comedian Judy Tenuta performed during the first night of the event.

Over the past 30 years, the IGBO has dealt with topical issues such as increasing participation by women, memorializing members who have succumbed to AIDS, raising funds for charitable organizations and the ongoing pursuit of increasing membership worldwide.

The organization's participation levels younger bowlers has somewhat lowered in part due to more favorable public opinion of LGBT persons; however, many younger members have left the organization as a result of poor management from both the executive board as well as league leadership.

How IGBO Works 
IGBO is a membership-based organization of member leagues, tournaments and individuals (associates).  Leagues and tournaments join IGBO to network and promote their events across the organization. Individuals can become a part of IGBO by joining a member league or individually as an associate member.

IGBO conducts business through a board of elected volunteers and a series of committees.  Twice annually, in November and May, IGBO conducts a conference to gather representatives from member leagues and tournaments and conduct business.

Host Cities for Past Conferences

References

External links 
 

International LGBT sports organizations
Sports organizations established in 1980
Bowling organizations